The Ochlockonee moccasinshell (Medionidus simpsonianus) is a species of freshwater mussel, an aquatic bivalve mollusk in the family Unionidae, the river mussels.

This species is endemic to the United States. Its natural habitat is rivers.

Original description 
Medionidus simpsonianus was described as a species by Bryant Walker in 1905 in The Nautilus journal:

References
This article incorporates public domain text - a public domain work by Bryant Walker (1856-1936, U.S.A.) from reference.

Medionidus
Molluscs of the United States
Molluscs described in 1905
ESA endangered species
Taxonomy articles created by Polbot